Jurupa Valley/Pedley station (formerly Pedley station) is a Metrolink train station in the Pedley neighborhood in the city of Jurupa Valley in Riverside County, California, United States. Metrolink's Riverside Line trains between Los Angeles Union Station and Riverside–Downtown station stop here.

It is located just east of Van Buren Boulevard and just north of Limonite Avenue, and has 283 parking spaces. The station is owned by the Riverside County Transportation Commission. Riverside Transit Agency bus routes 21 and 29 also serve the station.

The station was renamed from Pedley to Jurupa Valley/Pedley station on October 3, 2016, to reflect Jurupa Valley's 2011 incorporation as a city.

References

External links 

Metrolink stations in Riverside County, California
Jurupa Valley, California
Railway stations in the United States opened in 1993